The list of ambassadors of Belgium to South Korea began after diplomatic relations were established in 1901. The official title of this diplomat is "Ambassador of the Kingdom of Belgium to the Republic of Korea".

Belgian-Korean diplomatic relations were initially established during the Joseon period of Korean history.

After the Denmark-Korea Treaty of 1902 was negotiated, ministers from Denmark could have been appointed in accordance with this treaty.  However, diplomatic affairs were initially handled by the Belgian representative in Seoul.

List of heads of mission

Consuls-General 
 Leon Vincart, 1901

Ambassadors
 1989–1990 Andre Mernier
 1990 – 1991: Jean-Marie Noirfalisse
 1998 – 2000: Renier Nijskens
 2004: Koenraad Rouvroy
 2007: Victor Wei
 2008 – Pierre Clément Dubuisson
2016-2018 : Adrien Théatre
2018-2021: Peter Lescouhier
2021-present: Francois Bontemps

See also
 Belgium-Korea Treaty of 1901
 List of diplomatic missions in South Korea

Notes

References
 Halleck, Henry Wager. (1861).  International law: or, Rules regulating the intercourse of states in peace and war New York: D. Van Nostrand. OCLC 852699
 Kim, Chun-gil. (2005). The History of Korea. Westport, Connecticut: Greenwood Press. ; ;  OCLC 217866287
 Korean Mission to the Conference on the Limitation of Armament, Washington, D.C., 1921-1922. (1922). Korea's Appeal to the Conference on Limitation of Armament. Washington: U.S. Government Printing Office. OCLC 12923609

Korea, South
Ambassadors of Belgium to South Korea
Belgium